Jeanelle Scheper (born 21 November 1994) is a Saint Lucian high jumper. She is the second athlete from St. Lucia to qualify for the high jump final in the World Championships in Athletics after Levern Spencer did it starting in 2007 when in 2015 she joined Spencer in the final.

Career
She was born in Kingston, Jamaica to Barbadian parents and moved to Saint Lucia with her family at the age of two. While representing the University of South Carolina, Scheper became the 2015 NCAA Champion before graduating.

She competed for St. Lucia at the 2016 Summer Olympics in Rio de Janeiro. She placed 26th in qualifying and did not advance to the finals. She was the flag bearer for St. Lucia during the closing ceremony.

Her personal bests in the high jump are 1.96 metres outdoors (Starkville 2015) and 1.91 metres indoors (Fayetteville 2013).

Competition record

References

1994 births
Living people
Sportspeople from Kingston, Jamaica
Saint Lucian high jumpers
World Athletics Championships athletes for Saint Lucia
Female high jumpers
Athletes (track and field) at the 2014 Commonwealth Games
Athletes (track and field) at the 2018 Commonwealth Games
Commonwealth Games competitors for Saint Lucia
Athletes (track and field) at the 2015 Pan American Games
Athletes (track and field) at the 2019 Pan American Games
Pan American Games competitors for Saint Lucia
Athletes (track and field) at the 2016 Summer Olympics
Olympic athletes of Saint Lucia
Saint Lucian female athletes